Vance Township is a township in Vermilion County, Illinois, USA.  As of the 2010 census, its population was 1,057 and it contained 457 housing units.

History
Vance Township was created in 1866.

Geography

Cities and towns
 Fairmount

Adjacent townships
 Oakwood Township (northeast)
 Catlin Township (east)
 Jamaica Township (southeast)
 Sidell Township (south)
 South Homer Township, Champaign County (west)
 Ogden Township, Champaign County (northwest)

Cemeteries
The township contains two cemeteries: Bodkin and Davis.

Airports and landing strips
 Catlett Landing Strip
 Rockin 'B' Farms Airport

Demographics

References
 U.S. Board on Geographic Names (GNIS)
 United States Census Bureau cartographic boundary files

External links
 US-Counties.com
 City-Data.com
 Illinois State Archives

Townships in Vermilion County, Illinois
Townships in Illinois